Isotomodes is a genus of arthropods belonging to the family Isotomidae.

The species of this genus are found in Europe and America.

Species:
 Isotomodes alavensis Simòn et al., 1994
 Isotomodes alexius Palacios-Vargas & Kovàc, 1995

References

Collembola
Springtail genera